No Starch Press is an American publishing company, specializing in technical literature often geared towards the geek, hacker, and DIY subcultures. Popular titles include Hacking: The Art of Exploitation, Andrew Huang's Hacking the Xbox, and How Wikipedia Works.

Topics 
No Starch Press publishes books with a focus on networking, computer security, hacking, Linux, programming, technology for kids, Lego, math, and science. The publisher also releases educational comics like Super Scratch Programming Adventure and The Manga Guide to Science series.

History 
No Starch Press is a publishing company headquartered in San Francisco that was founded in 1994 by Bill Pollock, who has over 30 years of experience in the publishing industry. The company has published titles that have received recognition in the Communication Arts Design Annual and STEP inside 100 competition, and have been awarded the Independent Publisher Book Award (the IPPYs) from Independent Publisher magazine.

Availability 
No Starch Press titles are available online and in bookstores in all major English language markets worldwide. No Starch Press titles have been translated into over thirty languages.

Penguin Random House Publisher Services distributes No Starch Press titles in the U.S. and worldwide.

Popular books 
 Absolute OpenBSD
 Cult of Mac
 Debian System
 Hacking: The Art of Exploitation
 How Wikipedia Works
 Programming Linux Games
 English-language editions of several of The Manga Guides books:
  The Manga Guide to Biochemistry
  The Manga Guide to Calculus
  The Manga Guide to Cryptography
  The Manga Guide to Databases
  The Manga Guide to Electricity
  The Manga Guide to Linear Algebra
  The Manga Guide to Molecular Biology
  The Manga Guide to Physics
 The Manga Guide to Regression Analysis
 The Manga Guide to Relativity
 The Manga Guide to Statistics
 The Manga Guide to the Universe
 The Linux Programming Interface: A Linux and UNIX System Programming Handbook

References

External links 

Computer book publishing companies
Book publishing companies based in San Francisco
Publishing companies established in 1994
1994 establishments in California